The president of Latvia is head of state and commander-in-chief of the National Armed Forces of the Republic of Latvia.

The term of office is four years. Before 1999, it was three years. The president may be elected any number of times, but not more than twice in a row. In the event of the vacancy in the office of the president, the speaker of the Saeima assumes the duties of the president. For example, after the death of Jānis Čakste, Pauls Kalniņš, the speaker of the Saeima, was acting president briefly in 1927 until a new president could be elected.

Unlike his Estonian counterpart, the Latvian president's role is not entirely ceremonial. However, the president is not as powerful as the president of Lithuania. Unlike in Estonia, the president shares executive power with the cabinet and prime minister. However, the president is not politically responsible for carrying out all duties, and all presidential orders must be countersigned by a member of the cabinet – usually the prime minister.

The tenth and current officeholder, and sixth since the restoration of independence, is Egils Levits, who was elected on 28 May 2019 and began his first four-year term on 8 July 2019.

History and development 
The establishment of the institution of the president of Latvia was envisaged by the Satversme (Constitution) of the Republic of Latvia adopted by the Constitutional Assembly on 15 February 1922. Before the Satversme took effect, there was no separate office of President of Latvia.

A chairperson of the parliament undertook the duties of the head of state. According to the first provisional constitution, the political platform of the National Council of the Republic of Latvia dated 17 November 1918, Chairperson of the National Council of Latvia Jānis Čakste undertook the functions of the head of state from the day the Republic of Latvia was proclaimed to the day the Latvian Constitutional Assembly convened. On the other hand, the second provisional constitution, the Provisional Regulations on the Political System of the Republic of Latvia dated 1 June 1920, set forth that the president of the Latvian Constitutional Assembly Jānis Čakste fulfilled the functions of the head of state before the Satversme took legal effect and the Saeima (parliament) convened. It is interesting that the Law on the Satversme of the Republic of Latvia Entering into Force of 20 June 1922 stipulated that until the election of the president of Latvia, the president of the Latvian Constitutional Assembly would continue fulfilling his duties.

On 14 November 1922, the first convocation of the Saeima elected Čakste as president of the Republic of Latvia, who gave the solemn oath of the president of Latvia on 18 November 1922. Čakste was re-elected as president of Latvia by the second convocation of the Saeima on 6 November 1925, and he gave the oath on 8 November 1925. After Čakste died on 14 March 1927, the second convocation of the Saeima elected Gustavs Zemgals as president of Latvia on 8 April 1927, who gave the oath of the president of Latvia on the same day. The third convocation of the Saeima elected Alberts Kviesis as president of the Republic of Latvia on 9 April 1930, who gave the solemn oath on 11 April 1930. Kviesis was re-elected as president of Latvia by the fourth convocation of the Saeima on 4 April 1933, and he gave his oath on 11 April 1933.

Kviesis continued holding the office of the president of Latvia after the anti-constitutional coup d’état of 15 May 1934, and he accepted the replacement of a democratic and parliamentary republic with an authoritarian political system. When the second term of Kviesis as  president of Latvia was approaching its end, the Cabinet of Ministers passed the Law on the Execution of the President's Office on 12 March 1936. The law stipulated that after the second term of presidency of Kviesis ceased on 11 April 1936, Prime Minister Kārlis Ulmanis would undertake the position until the completion of the constitutional reform. By this law, the posts of the president of Latvia and prime minister were merged. On 11 April 1936, Kārlis Ulmanis became the president of Latvia and prime minister, remaining in these positions until the occupation of the Republic of Latvia on 17 June 1940.

The Soviet Union's aggression against the Republic of Latvi as well as the occupation and unlawful incorporation of the Republic of Latvia into the Union of Soviet Socialist Republics (USSR) in 1940, did not lead to any legal consequences, as the USSR violated the norms of international law and the fundamental laws of the Republic of Latvia. The Republic of Latvia continued to exist as an accepted subject of international law throughout the years of occupation. During that period, the Foreign Service of the Republic of Latvia continued to represent the Republic of Latvia in exile, which continued to operate until the restoration of the independence of Latvia. During the occupation, there have been attempts to restore the freedom of the Republic of Latvia and establish a government. At the meeting of the Latvian Central Council on 8 September 1944, it adopted a Declaration on the Restoration of the State of Latvia, by which the speaker of the last legally elected Saeima, Pauls Kalniņš, became acting president of Latvia. After the death of Kalniņš on 26 August 1945, the Latvian Central Council announced on 26 April 1947 that according to the Satversme, the powers of the speaker of the Saeima and the acting president of Latvia were taken over by Vice-Speaker of the Saeima Jāzeps Rancāns. The establishment of government in exile under the occupation regime was unsuccessful due to various reasons.

After the restoration of the independence of the Republic of Latvia, a separate post of President of Latvia was not created. During the transition period, Chairperson of the Supreme Council Anatolijs Gorbunovs undertook the duties of the head of state until the full restoration of the Satversme and the convening of the fifth convocation of the Saeima.

The rights of the chairperson of the Supreme Council to perform the functions of the head of state were determined at that time based on the Law on the Organization of the Work of the Supreme Council of the Republic of Latvia until the convening of the Saeima of 25 August 1992 and the Law on the Head of State of the Republic of Latvia before the gathering of the Saeima of 15 September 1992.

With the restoration of the Satversme in full, when the fifth convocation of the Saeima convened to the first session at noon on 6 July 1993, also meant the renovation of the institution of the president of Latvia. On 7 July 1993, the fifth convocation of the Saeima elected Guntis Ulmanis as president of Latvia, who gave the solemn oath of the president of Latvia on 8 July 1993. The sixth convocation of the Saeima re-elected Ulmanis as president of Latvia on 18 June 1996, and he gave the solemn oath on 8 July 1996.

The seventh convocation of the Saeima elected Vaira Vīķe-Freiberga as president of Latvia on 17 June 1999, with her giving the solemn oath of the president of Latvia on 8 July 1999. The Saeima re-elected Vīķe-Freiberga as president of Latvia on 20 June 2003, and she gave her solemn oath on 8 July 2003.
The ninth convocation of the Saeima elected Valdis Zatlers as president of Latvia on 31 May 2007, who gave the solemn oath of the president of Latvia on 8 July 2007.

On 2 June 2011, the tenth convocation of the Saeima elected Andris Bērziņš as president of the Latvia, and he gave his solemn oath of the president of Latvia on 8 July 2011.

In its turn, the twelfth convocation of the Saeima elected Raimonds Vējonis as president of Latvia on 3 June 2015, who gave the solemn oath of the president of Latvia on 8 July 2015.

In its turn, the convocation of the Saeima elected Egils Levits as president of Latvia, who gave the solemn oath of the president of Latvia on 8 July 2019.

Duties and rights

The powers of the president conferred to them by the Constitution of the Republic of Latvia 

The president represents Latvia in international relations, appoints the diplomatic representatives of Latvia, and also receives diplomatic representatives of other countries. The president implements the decisions of the Saeima concerning the ratification of international agreements (Article 41 of the Constitution of the Republic of Latvia).

The president is the Commander-in-Chief of the Armed Forces of Latvia. During wartime, the president appoints a Supreme Commander (Article 42 of the Constitution of the Republic of Latvia).

The president shall declare war by a decision of the Saeima. (Article 43 of the Constitution of the Republic of Latvia).

The president has the right to take whatever steps are necessary for the military defence of the State should another state declare war on Latvia or an enemy invade its borders. Concurrently and immediately, the president shall convene the Saeima, which shall decide as to the declaration and commencement of the war. (Article 44 of the Constitution of the Republic of Latvia).  

The president has the right to grant clemency to criminals against whom the judgment of the court has come into legal effect. The extent of, and procedures for, the utilisation of this right shall be set out in a specific law (Article 45 of the Constitution of the Republic of Latvia).  

The president has the right to convene and preside over extraordinary meetings of the Cabinet of Ministers and to determine the agenda of such meetings. (Article 46 of the Constitution of the Republic of Latvia).

The president as well as the Prime Minister, or not less than one-third of the Members of the Saeima may request that the Presidium convene sittings of the Saeima (Article 20 of the Constitution of the Republic of Latvia).

At the request of the president, ten Members of the Saeima, the Prime Minister, or a Minister, the Saeima may decide by a majority vote of not less than two-thirds of the Members present to sit in closed session (Article 22 of the Constitution of the Republic of Latvia).

The president is entitled to propose the dissolution of the Saeima. Following this proposal, a national referendum is to be held. If in the referendum more than half of the votes are cast in favour of dissolution, the Saeima is to be considered dissolved, new elections called, and such elections held no later than two months after the date of the dissolution of the Saeima (Article 48 of the Constitution of the Republic of Latvia).

If the Saeima has been dissolved, the mandate of the Members of the Saeima continues to be in effect until the newly elected Saeima has convened, but the dissolved Saeima may only hold sittings at the request of the president. The president shall determine the agenda of such sittings (Article 49 of the Constitution of the Republic of Latvia).

The president does not bear political responsibility for the fulfilment of presidential duties. All orders of the president are jointly signed by the prime minister or by the appropriate minister, who thus assumes full responsibility for such orders except the order on the dissolution of the Saeima (Article 48 of the Constitution of the Republic of Latvia) and invitation of the candidate for the office of the prime minister (Article 56 of the Constitution of the Republic of Latvia).

Membership of the Cabinet of Ministers is determined by the person who is asked to do so by the president (Article 56 of the Constitution of the Republic of Latvia).

Powers of the president in the area of legislation 
The president has the right to initiate legislation. (Article 47 of the Constitution of the Republic of Latvia).

The president proclaims laws passed by the Saeima not earlier than the tenth day and not later than the twenty-first day after the law has been adopted. The law comes into force fourteen days after its proclamation unless a different term has been specified in the law (Article 69 of the Constitution of the Republic of Latvia).

Within ten days of the adoption of the law by the Saeima, the president may require that a law is reconsidered using a written and reasoned request to the Chairperson of the Saeima. If the Saeima does not amend the law, then the president may not raise objections for a second time (Article 71 of the Constitution of the Republic of Latvia).

The president has the right to suspend the proclamation of law for two months.

The president shall suspend the proclamation of law if so requested by not less than one-third of the Members of the Saeima. This right may be exercised by the president, or by one-third of the Members of the Saeima, within ten days of the adoption of the law by the Saeima. The law thus suspended shall be put to a national referendum if so requested by not less than one-tenth of the electorate. If no such request is received during the aforementioned two-month period, the law shall then be proclaimed after the expiration of such period. A national referendum shall not take place, however, if the Saeima votes on the law again and not less than three-quarters of all Members of the Saeima vote for the adoption of the law (Article 72 of the Constitution of the Republic of Latvia).

Should the Saeima, by not less than a two-thirds majority vote, determine a law to be urgent, the president may not request reconsideration of such law, it may not be submitted to national referendum and the adopted law shall be proclaimed no later than the third day after the president has received it (Article 75 of the Constitution of the Republic of Latvia).

Electors, in number comprising not less than one-tenth of the electorate, have the right to submit a fully elaborated draft of an amendment to the Constitution or of law to the president, who shall present it to the Saeima (Article 78 of the Constitution of the Republic of Latvia).

The powers of the president provided for in other legislation of the Republic of Latvia 

Article 45 of the Constitution of Latvia provides for the exclusive right of the president to grant clemency to criminals. The extent of, and procedures for, the utilisation of this right are set out in a specific law subjected to the Constitution, the Law on Clemency.

Based on the general principles of the Constitution the duties and rights of the president are also envisaged in other laws not particularly specified in the Constitution of the Republic of Latvia. They are as follows:

1. The Law on the Power of Courts – the president must attend to the oath of judges (Section 68, paragraph 2).

2. The Law on State Security – the president, chairs the National Security Council.

3. The Law on the State Secret provides for the President's rights to receive the information containing the state secret, as well as which information is to be considered state secret relating to the highest authorities of the state.

4. The Law on the National Armed Forces – after the President's proposal the Saeima approves of as well as dismisses the Commander of the National Armed Forces (Section 14).

5. The Law on the Diplomatic and Consular Service – the president appoints and dismisses the extraordinary and plenipotentiary ambassadors by a joint recommendation of the Foreign Minister and the Commission of Foreign Affairs of the Saeima (Section 10).

6. The Law on the National Referendum and Initiation of Legislation – specifies the regulations of the Constitution of the Republic of Latvia and the President's role in the process.

7. The Law on the Order of Proclaiming, Publishing, Coming, and Being in Force of the Laws and Other Regulatory Enactments Passed by the Saeima, president, and the Cabinet of Ministers specifies the norms of the Constitution of the Republic of Latvia and the President's role in the legislation process.

8. The Law on Military Service: The president awards officer ranks by recommendations from the minister of defence, if the relevant soldier's correspondence to requirements stated in relevant laws has been examined by the Higher Attestation Commission (Section 32.2.1). The president takes away the rank of a soldier if the soldier has been convicted of a serious or particularly serious crime (Section 34). The president has the right to relieve a soldier of active military duty during times of peace (Section 44).

9. The Law on National Security: The president is the commander-in-chief of the National Armed Forces, chairs the National Security Council, appoints the senior commander of the National Armed Forces during times of war, establishes the President's Military Council, recommends candidates to become commanders of the National Armed Forces to Parliament, and asks Parliament to decide on a proclamation or launch of war (Section 8.1).

The president has the right, at his request, to receive information that is at the disposal of government institutions and offices, taking into account the regulations on the use of information that are stated in the law (Section 8.2).

The president is a member of the National Security Council (Section 19).

The president summons meetings of the National Security Council (Section 21).

Upon the proclamation of war against the state or a military invasion, the president must immediately act in accordance with the regulations of the National Defence Plan, issue instructions and orders to the National Armed Forces, as well as to state and local government institutions and the people of Latvia, summon a meeting of Parliament to take a decision on the proclamation and launching of war, and appoint the senior commander of the National Armed Forces (Section 24.1).

If the president should find that Parliament could not assemble to take a decision on a proclamation of war, he must order the commander of the National Armed Forces to take full control over the functions of the senior commander (Section 24.2).

10. The competence of the president in awarding state awards is defined in the Law on State Awards (valid since 7 April 2004).

The law on the provision of functioning of the president of Latvia 

 The president is subjected to the same limitations of the conflict of interests as the law provides regarding other state authorities (Section 13),
 The person, who has been elected president, may not join the military or specific service of other countries after leaving the office of president (Section 14),
 The President's office management is executed by the Chancery of the President of Latvia, which settles the matters connected with the president. The Chancery of the President of Latvia is a legal entity, and it possesses a seal with an image of the big coat-of-arms of the state.

Election of the president

Eligibility 
Any person who enjoys full rights of citizenship and who has attained the age of forty years may be elected president. A person with dual citizenship may not be elected president.

The office of the president must not be held concurrently with any other office. If the person elected as president is a Member of the Saeima, they have to resign their mandate as a Member of the Saeima.

Elections and inauguration 
The president is elected in the first round if he receives the absolute majority of the total number of deputies, i.e. 51 votes out of 100.

In case of failure, another round is organized with the same candidates or different ones, and under the same conditions. If no one is elected, others rounds are held until a candidate receives 51 votes and becomes President of Latvia. The president of the Saeima chairs the electoral college.

At the first sitting of the Saeima held after the election of the president, the president, on assuming office, shall take the following solemn oath: “I swear that all of my work will be dedicated to the welfare of the people of Latvia. I will do everything in my power to promote the prosperity of the Republic of Latvia and all who live here. I will hold sacred and will observe the Constitution of Latvia and the laws of the State. I will act justly towards all and will fulfil my duties conscientiously.”.

Incumbency

Term limit 
The Saeima elects the president for a term of four years (Article 35 of the Constitution of the Republic of Latvia). The same person must not hold office as president for more than eight consecutive years.

Vacancies and succession 
If the president resigns from office, dies or is removed from office before their term has ended in such cases, the chairperson of the Saeima assumes the duties of the president until the Saeima has elected a new president. Similarly, the chairperson of the Saeima assumes the duties of the president if the latter is away from Latvia or is unable to fulfil the duties of the office or any other reason.

Upon the proposal of not less than half of all of the members of the Saeima, the Saeima may decide, in a closed session and with a majority vote of not less than two-thirds of all of its Members, to remove the president from office.

If the president has initiated the dissolution of the Saeima, but more than half of the votes are cast against the dissolution of the Saeima in the referendum, then the president shall be deemed to be removed from office, and the Saeima shall elect a new president to serve for the remaining term of office of the president so removed.

Residence 

Riga Castle is the official residence of the president. Used extensively by the presidents of Latvia during the first period of independence, starting in 1922. In 1935 during Kārlis Ulmanis presidency, Riga Castle was expanded to its now iconic look, with a new "Latvian" tower, it was built to be taller than German churches. During Soviet times Riga Castle hosted a school. In 1994 it was renovated to meet the needs of the president.

It has four floors, multiple halls for guests, a big cabinet for the president, multiple museums hosting diplomatic gifts from presidents of other countries.

Jūrmala Residence is the official retreat for the president of the Latvia. Built in the Soviet times, to host high ranking Soviet officials during their stay in Latvia, it was renovated for the needs of president of Latvia in 1993. Andris Bērziņš was the only president that refused to use Jūrmala residence due to its past as a guest house for Soviet officials.

It has 3 floors. It hosts a big park, an indoor swimming pool, a guest room for meeting diplomatic guests, a personal beach in the shore of Jūrmala. It has a basketball hoop, that was built for the needs of president Zatlers.

Official guest house of the parliament and the president was renovated in the 1990s for guest purposes. During the renovation of Jurmala Residence in 2019 president Levits stayed in a guest house. During renovations in Riga Castle president Ulmanis and president Gorbunovs in the 1990s used this house as the official residence.

Travel 
The president uses a Lexus car for his or her everyday travel. For longer trips, they take a Latvian armed forces helicopter. For international travel, the president does not have an official plane and uses an AirBaltic plane, a Latvian state-owned airline.

Post-presidency 

After the presidency, the president may retire from politics. Zatlers and Gorbunovs continued on in politics as faces of the multiple parties. For example, Gorbunovs was the face of the political party "New Way" in 1995, and Zatlers of the Reform Party in 2012.

Every president receives their office, staff, and a car as well as security and home in center of the city of Riga. Former presidents get a pension according to the salary.

Vīķe-Freiberga continues to give lectures and educate on politics in Latvia and abroad.

List of the presidents 
 Parties

 Status

See also
List of presidents of Latvia by age
Lists of office-holders
List of Chairmen of the Presidium of the Supreme Soviet of the Latvian Soviet Socialist Republic ("head of state" during the occupation era)

Notes

References

Presidents
Latvia
 List
1922 establishments in Latvia